This is a list of the Australian moth species of the family Nepticulidae. It also acts as an index to the species articles and forms part of the full List of moths of Australia.

Pectinivalvinae
Pectinivalva acmenae Hoare, 2013
Pectinivalva anazona (Meyrick, 1906)
Pectinivalva brevipalpa Hoare, 2013
Pectinivalva caenodora (Meyrick, 1906)
Pectinivalva chalcitis (Meyrick, 1906)
Pectinivalva commoni Scoble, 1983
Pectinivalva endocapna (Meyrick, 1906)
Pectinivalva funeralis (Meyrick, 1906)
Pectinivalva gilva (Meyrick, 1906)
Pectinivalva libera (Meyrick, 1906)
Pectinivalva melanotis (Meyrick, 1906)
Pectinivalva minotaurus Hoare, 2013
Pectinivalva mystaconota Hoare, 2013
Pectinivalva planetis (Meyrick, 1906)
Pectinivalva primigena (Meyrick, 1906)
Pectinivalva quintiniae Hoare & Van Nieukerken, 2013
Pectinivalva scotodes Hoare, 2013
Pectinivalva trepida (Meyrick, 1906)
Pectinivalva tribulatrix Van Nieukerken & Hoare, 2013
Pectinivalva warburtonensis (Wilson, 1939)
Roscidotoga callicomae Hoare, 2000
Roscidotoga eucryphiae Hoare, 2000
Roscidotoga lamingtonia Van Nieukerken, Van den Berg & Hoare, 2011
Roscidotoga sapphiripes Hoare, 2000

Nepticulinae
Ectoedemia hadronycha Hoare, 2000
Ectoedemia pelops Hoare, 2000
Ectoedemia squamibunda Hoare, 2000
Stigmella leucargyra (Meyrick, 1906)
Stigmella phyllanthina (Meyrick, 1906)
Stigmella symmora (Meyrick, 1906)

External links 
Nepticulidae at Australian Faunal Directory

Australia
Nepticulidae